Abdulaziz Khayri (born 18 June 1997) is a Qatari handball player for Al-Ahli and the Saudi Arabian national team.

He represented Saudi Arabia at the 2019 World Men's Handball Championship.

References

1997 births
Living people
Saudi Arabian male handball players
21st-century Saudi Arabian people